The 2019 WGC-Dell Technologies Match Play was the 21st WGC Match Play, played March 27–31 at Austin Country Club in Austin, Texas. It was the second of four World Golf Championships in 2019.

Kevin Kisner, runner-up in 2018, defeated 2013 champion Matt Kuchar in the final, 3 & 2.

Course layout
Austin Country Club

Source:

Field
The field consisted of the top 64 players available from the Official World Golf Ranking on March 17. However, the seedings were based on the World Rankings on March 24.

Rickie Fowler (ranked 8th on March 17, personal reasons) and Adam Scott (29th, personal reasons) did not compete, allowing entry for Satoshi Kodaira (65th) and Luke List (66th).

Format
The first phase of the tournament involves players being split into 16 groups of four players. Each group is decided by a round-robin format played over Wednesday to Friday, with the sixteen group winners advancing to the knock out phase. The group winner is decided by awarding 1 point for a win, and ½ point for a halved match. If two or more players are tied on points at the conclusion of the group phase, sudden death stroke play playoff is played between tied players.

The group winners play the round of sixteen on Saturday morning, and the quarterfinal on Saturday afternoon. The semifinals are played on Sunday morning, and the final and third place playoff are played on Sunday afternoon. In total, the winner will play seven rounds of golf.

Pool A

Pool B

Pool C

Pool D

Results

Pool play
Players were divided into 16 groups of four players and play round-robin matches Wednesday to Friday.
Round 1 – March 27
Round 2 – March 28
Round 3 – March 29

Final 16 bracket

Prize money breakdown

 Source:

References

External links

Official 2019 Leaderboard
Coverage on the European Tour's official site
Austin Country Club

WGC Match Play
Golf in Texas
Sports in Austin, Texas
WGC-Dell Technologies Match Play
WGC-Dell Technologies Match Play
WGC-Dell Technologies Match Play
WGC-Dell Technologies Match Play